The Fargo Theatre is an art deco movie theater in downtown Fargo, North Dakota, United States. Construction on the building began in the fall of 1925 and the theatre opened on March 15, 1926.  It was restored in 1999 to its historic appearance and now is a center for the arts in the Fargo-Moorhead metropolitan area.  The Fargo Theatre is home to a 4-manual, 32-rank Wurlitzer Theatre Pipe Organ, known as the "Mighty Wurlitzer," which is owned and maintained by the Red River Theatre Organ Society, a non-profit organization and local chapter of the American Theatre Organ Society.

The building is listed on the National Register of Historic Places.

Events

Fargo Film Festival 
Since 2001, The Fargo Theatre has served as the main venue of the Fargo Film Festival. The festival has accepted submissions from many independent filmmakers from more than 32 American states and 15 countries.

References

External links

Fargo Theatre website
Fargo Theatre at CinemaTreasures.org
Fargo Theatre at the Moviemaking Wiki <--Dead link, December 2015.

Art Deco architecture in North Dakota
Buildings and structures in Fargo, North Dakota
Theatres on the National Register of Historic Places in North Dakota
Theatres completed in 1926
Tourist attractions in Fargo, North Dakota
1926 establishments in North Dakota
National Register of Historic Places in Cass County, North Dakota
Individually listed contributing properties to historic districts on the National Register in North Dakota